Paramparça may refer to:

 Paramparça (film), 1985 Turkish film
 Paramparça (TV series), 2014 Turkish TV series